The 2022–23 season is the 119th season in the existence of Hull City Association Football Club and the club's second consecutive season in the Championship. In addition to the league, they competed in the 2022–23 FA Cup and the 2022–23 EFL Cup.

Events
 On 17 June 2022, Harvey Cartwright agreed to join Peterborough United on a season long loan.
 On 28 June 2022, George Honeyman moved to Millwall for an undisclosed fee.
 On 28 June 2022, Tobias Figueiredo signed a two-year contract with the club as a free transfer following his release by Nottingham Forest.
 On 29 June 2022, George Moncur moved to Leyton Orient on a three-year deal for an undisclosed fee.
 On 1 July 2022, Ozan Tufan, from Fenerbahçe, signed a three-year deal for an undisclosed fee.
 On 4 July 2022 Nathan Baxter re-joined the club on a season-long loan from Chelsea.
 On 5 July 2022 Jack Leckie signed a two-year deal on a free transfer from Burnley.
 On 6 July 2022, Vaughn Covil signed a one-year deal on a free transfer from Forest Green Rovers.
 On 6 July 2022, Conor Sellars joined as Under-23 Lead Professional Development Phase Coach.
 On 8 July 2022, Jean Michaël Seri signed a three-year contract with the club on free transfer after being released by  Fulham.
 On 9 July 2022, Allahyar Sayyadmanesh of Fenerbahçe signed a four-year contract with the club for an undisclosed fee.
 On 9 July 2022, Brandon Fleming signed a three-year contract extension with the club.
 On 12 July 2022, Keane Lewis-Potter signed a six-year deal with Brentford for an undisclosed, but club-record, fee.
 On 13 July 2022, Óscar Estupiñán of Vitória S.C. signed a three-year deal with the club for an undisclosed fee.
 On 20 July 2022, Doğukan Sinik signed a three-year deal with Hull, for an undisclosed fee from Antalyaspor.
 On 22 July 2022, the club announced that the under-21's would be playing their home games at North Ferriby's ground, also that the academy had extended their lease of the ground at Bishop Burton College for a further two-years.
 On 23 July 2022, Benjamin Tetteh signed a two-year deal with the club on a free transfer from Yeni Malatyaspor.
 On 26 July 2022, the club announced that CEO James Rodwell had left the club.
 On 26 July 2022, the contract of Festus Arthur was terminated by mutual consent so he could join FC Halifax Town.
 On 28 July 2022, Andy Smith signed a new two-year contract with the club and moved on a season-long loan to Grimsby Town.
 On 28 July 2022, Lewie Coyle was appointed club captain for the season.
 On 3 August 2022, Jim Simms from Oldham Athletic signed a two-year deal with the academy.
 On 9 August 2022, Thimothée Lo-Tutala signed a three-year deal with the club after compensation was agreed with Tottenham Hotspur.
 On 15 August 2022, Louie Chorlton signed a six-month contract with the Academy from Bradford City, in January 2023 the contract was extended to the end of the season.
 On 16 August 2022, Will Jarvis joined Scarborough Athletic on a month-long loan spell.
 On 18 August 2022, Ryan Woods, signed a three-year deal with the option of a one-year extension for an undisclosed fee from Birmingham City.
 On 18 August 2022, Jacob Greaves signed a four-year contract extension with the club, with the option of a further year.
 On 18 August 2022, Harry Fisk joined Tadcaster Albion on a six-month loan deal.
 On 19 August 2022, David Robson joined Crawley Town on a six-month loan deal.
 On 22 August 2022, Mallik Wilks signed for Sheffield Wednesday for an undisclosed fee.
 On 23 August 2022, Salah-Eddine Oulad M'Hand joined on a season-long loan from Arsenal.
 On 26 August 2022, Cyrus Christie signed a two-year deal, on a free transfer from Fulham.
 On 1 September 2022, McCauley Snelgrove joined Crusaders on a season-long loan, but was cut short when he was recalled in January 2023.
 On 1 September 2022, Adama Traoré joined on a two-year deal as a free transfer from Hatayspor.
 On 1 September 2022, Xavier Simons joined the club on a season-long loan spell from Chelsea.
 On 1 September 2022, Dimitrios Pelkas joined the club on a season-long loan spell from Fenerbahçe.
 On 1 September 2022, Jevon Mills joined Gateshead on loan until January 2023.
 On 1 September 2022, Harvey Vale was brought in on a season-long loan from Chelsea, but this was cut short when he returned to Chelsea on 23 January 2023.
 On 30 September 2022, head coach Shota Arveladze was sacked after a run of four league defeats and Andy Dawson was appointed as interim head coach. At the same time assistant head coach, Peter van der Veen left the club.
 On 30 September 2022, Ben Voase joined Barton Town to gain work experience.
 On 18 October 2022, ahead of the trip to Blackpool, former Hull City player Robbie Stockdale was brought in, on a temporary basis, to assist Andy Dawson.
 On 19 October 2022, the club confirmed that Beri Pardo had been appointed head of performance strategy.
 On 3 November 2022, the club announced Liam Rosenior as the new head coach on a two-and-a-half-year deal.
 On 4 November 2022, the club announced that Justin Walker would be a new assistant head coach working alongside Andy Dawson.
 On 4 November 2022, Oliver Green moved on a month-long loan spell to Marske United.
 On 4 November 2022, Josh Hinds and Tom Nixon moved on a month-long loan spell to Boston United.
 On 24 November 2022, Ben Warner joined the backroom staff as coach analyst.
 On 25 November 2022, Onur Zayim joined the backroom staff of the Academy as an Under-15s and Under-16s coach.
 On 9 December 2022, Andy Cannon signed a two-and-a-half year deal with Wrexham for an undisclosed fee.
 On 16 December 2022, Harry Lovick joined Marske United on a month-long loan spell.
 On 23 December 2022, Jim Simms joined Buxton on a month-long loan spell.
 On 5 January 2023, Billy Chadwick joined   Boston United on a month-long loan spell, which was extended for a further month on 2 February 2023 and on 6 March 2023 extended for the rest of the season.
 On 5 January 2023, Randell Williams moved to Bolton Wanderers on a two-and-a-half-year deal for an undisclosed fee.
 On 6 January, Brandon Fleming joined  Oxford United on loan for the rest of the season.
 On 6 January 2023, Aaron Connolly joined the club on loan from Brighton & Hove Albion for the rest of the season.
 On 12 January 2023, Doğukan Sinik joined Antalyaspor on loan until the end of the season.
 On 16 January 2023, Harvey Cartwright loan at Peterborough United was cut short and David Robson loan at Crawley Town ended.
 On 19 January 2023, Malcolm Ebiowei joined on loan from Crystal Palace until the end of the season.
 On 26 January 2023, Harvey Cartwright moved to Wycombe Wanderers on loan until the end of the season.
 On 27 January 2023, Callum Jones signed a new two-and-a-half-year contract with Hull City.
 On 31 January 2023, Tyler Smith joined Oxford United on loan until the end of the season.
 On 31 January 2023, Salah-Eddine Oulad M'Hand returned to his parent club Arsenal.
 On 31 January 2023, James Scott  moved to Exeter City for an undisclosed fee.
 On 31 January 2023, Yuriel Celi of Carlos A. Mannucci signed a two-and-a-half year deal with the club for an undisclosed fee, he was then loaned to Club Universitario de Deportes until the end of the year.
 On 31 January 2023, Josh Emmanuel signed a deal with Grimsby Town for an undisclosed fee.
 On 31 January 2023, Harry Vaughan of Oldham Athletic joined on an 18-month contract for an undisclosed fee.
 On 31 January 2023, Karl Darlow of Newcastle United joined on loan until the end of the season.
 On 2 February 2023, Jake Leake joined Scunthorpe United on loan for three-months.
 On 10 February 2023, Jevon Mills joined Solihull Moors on a 28-day loan spell, and Tom Nixon returned to  Boston United on loan until the end of the season.
 On 14 February 2023, McCauley Snelgrove joined Spennymoor Town on a month-long loan spell.
 On 17 February 2023, Louie Chorlton and Josh Hinds joined Bradford (Park Avenue) on a month-long loan spell.
 On 1 March 2023, goalkeeper Kornel Misciur moved to Liverpool for an undisclosed fee.
 On 6 March 2023, former player David Meyler joined the academy staff as a casual Under-15s coach.
 On 8 March 2023, Matty Jacob signed a new one-and-a-half-year contact with the club.
 On 13 March 2023, Jevon Mills loan at Solihull Moors was extended for another month.
 On 16 March 2023, loanee Xavier Simons, from Chelsea, signed a three-year deal for an undisclosed fee.

Players

Current squad

Out on loan

Transfers

Transfers in

Transfers out

Loans in

Loans out

Pre-season and friendlies

The first pre-season matches announced on 17 June 2022 would be against Cambridge United and Peterborough United, both to be played on 23 July 2022, with the players split between the 2 games. The team reported back for the start of pre-season training on 20 June 2022. The club later announced pre-season games in Turkey and Spain against Fenerbahçe, Brighton & Hove Albion U23s and Málaga.
The team will travel to Turkey on 8 July 2022, for the fiendly match against Fenerbahçe before relocating to the Marbella Football Centre in Spain for an eight-day warm weather training camp. They will play two matches on 16 July 2022 at the centre, before returning home on 18 July 2022. On 2 July 2022, it was announced that a pre-season match against Leicester City would be played at home on 20 July 2022, in what will be known as the Corendon Cup.

Mid-season and friendlies
The club took the opportunity of the World Cup break for a week-long training camp in Turkey. The team were accompanied on the trip by 320 supporters on an all expenses paid holiday courtesy of club owner Acun Ilıcalı. Two friendly matches were planned for the trip, 30 November 2022 against İstanbul Başakşehir and 3 December 2022, against Trabzonspor.

Competitions

Overall record

Championship

League table

Results summary

Results by round

Matches

The league fixtures were announced at 9:00 a.m. on 23 June 2022. Hull start the season with a home game against Bristol City and finish the season away to Luton Town.
Due to the 2022 FIFA World Cup in Qatar, the Championship will take a 4 week break mid-season during the tournament. The break will commence in mid-November and the first round of fixtures after the World Cup will be held on 10 December.
In January the EFL announced the postponement of the final match of the season to 15:00 on 8 May 2023 to avoid a clash with the coronation of Charles III on the Saurday.

FA Cup

Hull enter the competition at the Third round stage, the draw for which took place on 28 November 2022. Hull were drawn at home against Premier League club Fulham, managed by former City manager Marco Silva.

EFL Cup

The draw for the First Round of the cup took place on 23 June 2022 at 2:30 p.m., with matches taking place during the week starting 8 August 2022. Hull City were drawn away to Bradford City in the first round. The match was selected for live coverage by Sky Sports. The match took place on 9 August 2022, and Hull got off to a fortunate start when, halfway through the first half, Randell Williams passed in for Ozan Tufan to strike the bar. The ball rebounded on to Bradford's goalkeeper, Harry Lewis and ended-up in the net. Towards the end of the first half Andy Cook headed in a cross, and minutes later from a corner, Cook struck again. With no further goals, Hull failed to progress to the next round.

Statistics

Appearances

Note: Appearances shown after a "+" indicate player came on during course of the match.

Top goalscorers

Disciplinary record

Kits
On 20 December 2021, the club unveiled the third kit for the 2022–23 season would be the away kit used in the 2021–22 season – a blackout kit with a "tone-on-tone front stripe". The shorts would be black with a tonal side panel and black socks with tonal cuff detail. On 30 June 2022, the club announced that Giacom had agreed to step aside from their front of shirt sponsorship deal, but would remain sponsors for the club's training-ware range of goods. The following day, it was announced that a club-record Championship deal had been done with Corendon Airlines to become the shirt sponsor for the season.
On 3 July 2022 Hull City revealed the home kit for the 2022–23 season, exactly a week before the pre-season campaign began. The shirt would be a traditional black and amber striped pattern with white pinstriped border. The shorts would be black with a contrast coloured middle panel and the socks would be black with amber calf hoop.

On 9 July 2022 the club announced that Tomya would become the back-of-shorts sponsor of all their match kits.

The away kit was revealed on 19 July 2022, a white shirt with grey pinstripes, coloured striped cuffs. Shorts would be red with coloured side panels, socks would be white with 4 thin coloured hoops.

On 16 September 2022 the club announced that Efes Beverage Group would become the back-of-shirts sponsor of all their match kits.

References

Hull City
Hull City A.F.C. seasons
Hull City A.F.C. 2022–23
English football clubs 2022–23 season